Paradise Creek is a  tributary of Brodhead Creek in the Poconos of eastern Pennsylvania in the United States.

Paradise Creek joins Brodhead Creek at the community of Analomink in Monroe County.

See also
List of rivers of Pennsylvania

References

Rivers of Monroe County, Pennsylvania
Rivers of Pennsylvania
Pocono Mountains
Tributaries of Brodhead Creek